List of Brazilian Air Force units is a list of currently active air and ground-based units of the Brazilian Air Force (FAB).

Primary air units
For a long time the Brazilian Air Force was organized in Air Forces (1st (operational training), 2nd (maritime patrol and rotary wing), 3rd (air combat forces) and 5th (air transport)) and Air Regions (1st through 7th). With the ongoing reorganization of the FAB they have been disbanded in 2017 and their units were combined in 12 (initially 15) Wings called Alas.

Designation Examples:

1° Grupo de Defesa Aérea (1.° GDA) - 1st Air Defence Group - the fighter unit covering the capital Brasília. In the past squadrons constituted groups. Today the squadrons are independent units and their group designations are purely ceremonial.

2º Esquadrão / 1º Grupo de Aviação de Caça (2º/1º GAvCa) - 2nd Squadron / 1st Fighter Aviation Group. 1º/1º GAvCa and 2º/1º GAvCa carry on the traditions of the Brazilian fighter units that took part in the Italian Campaign of World War II.

3º Esquadrão de Transporte Aéreo (3º ETA) - 3rd Air Transport Squadron - regional liaison and utility squadrons, formerly under the Air Regions.

1° Grupo de Transporte (1º GT) - 1st Transport Group

1° Grupo de Transporte de Tropa (1º GTT) - 1st Troop Transport Group - its main task is support of the Brazilian Army's airborne brigade.

Esquadrão de Demonstração Aérea (EDA) - Air Display Squadron, the famous Smoke Squadron, attached to the Air Force Academy.

Esquadrão Aeroterrestre de Salvamento (EAS) - Airborne Rescue Squadron, also known by its patch Para-SAR, the Air Force's elite special forces unit.

Grupo (ou Esquadrão) de Segurança e Defesa - Belém (GSD-BE) - Security and Defence Group (or Squadron) - regional units, former air force infantry battalions under the Air Regions.

1ª Brigada de Defesa Antiaérea (1ª BDAAE) - 1st Air Defence Brigade

Secondary air units

See also
Brazilian Air Force

References

External links
 Brazilian Air Force website